Adi Rocha Sobrinho Filho (born 15 December 1985), commonly known as Adi Rocha or simply Adi, is a Brazilian former professional footballer who played as a striker.

Club career
Adi was born in Riachão, Maranhão.

Energie Cottbus
Adi transferred to Energie Cottbus from Austria Kärnten in the 2009 winter transfer window after scoring 10 goals in 17 games. After he was injured in his first match in the Bundesliga Adi was not able to play anymore due to a severe injury (persistent cartilage damage). After being sidelined for two years, his contract was terminated at the end of the 2010–11 season.

Concordia Chiajna
Adi went to Liga I side Concordia Chiajna to restart his career. Not being held back by knee problems, he had a great spell at Chiajna, scoring eight goals from 15 games, to help his team avoid relegation to Liga II.

Steaua București
In May 2012, Adi was brought to Steaua București by his former Concordia Chiajna manager Laurențiu Reghecampf. On 23 July, he made his first appearance for Steaua in a game against his former team Concordia Chiajna which ended in a 1–0 victory for the Bucharest team. He scored his first goal a week later against Astra Ploiești in a dramatic game that ended with the 4–3 victory of his team. On 30 August, he scored two goals against Ekranas in the Europa League play-off, to secure Steaua their presence in the group stages.

Žalgiris Vilnius
In July 2014, he signed with Žalgiris Vilnius.

Career statistics

Honours
Steaua București
Romanian Championship League: 2012–13

Gamba Osaka
J2 League: 2013

Žalgiris Vilnius
Lithuanian Championship: 2014

References

External links
 Liga 1 profile
 
 

Living people
1985 births
Sportspeople from Maranhão
Association football forwards
Brazilian footballers
LASK players
Mirassol Futebol Clube players
SK Austria Kärnten players
FC Energie Cottbus players
CS Concordia Chiajna players
FC Steaua București players
Gamba Osaka players
FK Žalgiris players
Jiangxi Beidamen F.C. players
Austrian Football Bundesliga players
Bundesliga players
Liga I players
J2 League players
China League One players
Brazilian expatriate footballers
Expatriate footballers in Austria
Expatriate footballers in Germany
Expatriate footballers in Romania
Expatriate footballers in Japan
Expatriate footballers in China
Brazilian expatriate sportspeople in Austria
Brazilian expatriate sportspeople in Germany
Brazilian expatriate sportspeople in Romania
Brazilian expatriate sportspeople in Japan
Brazilian expatriate sportspeople in China